Heinz von Foerster (German spelling: Heinz von Förster; November 13, 1911 – October 2, 2002) was an Austrian American scientist combining physics and philosophy, and widely attributed as the originator of Second-order cybernetics. He was twice a Guggenheim fellow (1956–57 and 1963–64) and also was a fellow of the American Association for the Advancement of Science, 1980. He is well known for his 1960 Doomsday equation formula published in Science predicting future population growth.

As a polymath, he wrote nearly two hundred professional papers, gaining renown in fields from computer science and artificial intelligence to epistemology, and researched high-speed electronics and electro-optics switching devices as a physicist, and in biophysics, the study of memory and knowledge. He worked on cognition based on neurophysiology, mathematics, and philosophy and was called "one of the most consequential thinkers in the history of cybernetics". He came to the United States, and stayed after meeting with Warren Sturgis McCulloch, where he received funding from The Pentagon to establish the Biological Computer Laboratory, which built the first parallel computer, the Numa-Rete. Working with William Ross Ashby, one of the original Ratio Club members, and together with Warren McCulloch, Norbert Wiener, John von Neumann and Lawrence J. Fogel, Heinz von Foerster was an architect of cybernetics and one of the members of the Macy conferences, eventually becoming editor of its early proceedings alongside Hans-Lukas Teuber and Margaret Mead.

Biography
Von Foerster was born in 1911 in Vienna, Austria-Hungary, as Heinz von Förster. His paternal grandfather was Austrian architect Emil Ritter von Foerster. His maternal grandmother was Marie Lang, an Austrian feminist, theosophist and publisher. He studied physics at the Technical University of Vienna and at the University of Breslau, where in 1944 he received a PhD in physics. His relatives included Ludwig Wittgenstein, Erwin Lang and Hugo von Hofmannsthal. Ludwig Förster was his great-grandfather. His Jewish roots didn't cause him much troubles while he worked in radar laboratories during the Nazi era, as "he hid his ancestry with the help of an employer who chose not to press him for documents on his family."

He moved to the US in 1949, and worked at the University of Illinois at Urbana–Champaign, where he was a professor of electrical engineering from 1951 to 1975. He also was professor of biophysics (1962–1975) and Director of the Biological Computer Laboratory (1958–1975). Additionally, in 1956–57 and 1963–64 he was a Guggenheim Fellow and also President of the Wenner-Gren-Foundation for anthropological research from 1963 to 1965.

He knew well and was in conversation with John von Neumann, Norbert Wiener, Humberto Maturana, Francisco Varela, Gordon Pask, Gregory Bateson, Lawrence J. Fogel and Margaret Mead, among many others. He influenced generations of students as a teacher and inclusive, enthusiastic collaborator.

He died on October 2, 2002 in Pescadero, California.

Work
Von Foerster was influenced by the Vienna Circle and Ludwig Wittgenstein. He worked in the field of cybernetics and is known as the inventor of second-order cybernetics.  He made important contributions to constructivism. He is also known for his interest in computer music and magic.

The electron tube laboratory
In 1949, von Foerster started work at the University of Illinois at Urbana–Champaign at the electron tube laboratory of the Electrical Engineering Department, where he succeeded Joseph Tykociński-Tykociner. With his students he developed many innovative devices, including ultra-high-frequency electronics

He also worked on mathematical models of population dynamics and in 1959 published a model now called the "von Foerster equation", which is derivable from the principles of constant aging and conservation of mass.

where: n = n(t,a), t stands for time and a for age. m(a) is the death in function of the population age; n(t,a) is the population density in function of age.

When m(a) = 0, we have:

It relates that a population ages, and that fact is the only one that influences change in population density.

It is therefore a continuity equation; it can be solved using the method of characteristics. Another way is by similarity solution; and a third is a numerical approach such as finite differences.

The gross birth rate is given by the following boundary condition:

The solution is only unique given the initial conditions

which states that the initial population distribution must be given; then it will evolve according to the partial differential equation.

Biological Computer Laboratory
In 1958, he formed the Biological Computer Lab, studying similarities in cybernetic systems in biology and electronics.

Macy conferences
He was the youngest member of the core group of the Macy conferences on Cybernetics and editor of the five volumes of Cybernetics (1949–1953), a series of conference transcripts that represent important foundational conversations in the field. It was von Foerster who suggested that Wiener's coinage "Cybernetics" be applied to this conference series, which had previously been called "Circular Causal and Feedback Mechanisms in Biological and Social Systems".

Doomsday equation
A 1960 issue of Science magazine included an article by von Foerster and his colleagues P. M. Mora and L. W. Amiot proposing a formula representing a best fit to available historical data on world population; the authors then predicted future population growth on the basis of this formula.
The formula gave 2.7 billion as the 1960 world population and predicted that population growth would become infinite by Friday, November 13, 2026 – von Foerster's 115th birthday anniversary – a prediction that earned it the name "the Doomsday Equation."

Based on population data obtained from various sources, von Foerster and his students concluded that world population growth over the centuries was faster than an exponential. In such a situation, doubling-time decreases over time. Von Foerster's tongue-in-cheek prediction of Doomsday on November 13, 2026, was based on an extrapolation into the future of doubling-time, with the finding that doubling-time would decrease to zero on that date.

Responders to his Doomsday prediction objected on the grounds of the finite human gestation time of 9 months, and the transparent fact that biological systems rarely persist in exponential growth for any substantial length of time. Those who knew von Foerster could see in his rejoinders an evident sense of humor.

See also

 Logarithmic timeline
 Macy conferences
 Power law: The equation that he derived for the date calculated is one that nowadays is called a power law.
 List of dates predicted for apocalyptic events
 The Dream of Reality by Lynn Segal, 1986. A book summarizing von Foerster's constructivist epistemology.

Publications
Von Foerster authored more than 100 publications. Books, a selection:

 1949, Cybernetics: Transactions of the Sixth Conference, (editor), Josiah Macy Jr. Foundation: New York, 220 pp.
 2002, Understanding understanding, a volume of von Foerster's papers, published by Springer-Verlag, 2002.
 2010, with Monika Broecker: Part of the World. Fractals of Ethics – A Drama in Three Acts. Heinz von Foerster's most extensive biography. First published in German in 2002: with Monika Broecker. Teil der Welt. Fraktale einer Ethik – ein Drama in drei Akten.

Articles, a selection:
 1958, "Basic Concepts of Homeostasis." In: Homeostatic Mechanisms, Upton, New York, pp. 216–242, 1958.
 1960, "Doomsday: Friday, November 13, AD 2026," with P. M. Mora und L. W. Amiot, Science 132, pp. 1291–1295, 1960.
 1961, "A Predictive Model for Self-Organizing Systems," Part I: Cybernetica 3, pp. 258–300; Part II: Cybernetica 4, pp. 20–55, with Gordon Pask, 1961.
 1964, "Biological Computers," with W. Ross Ashby, In: Bioastronautics, K. E. Schaefer, Macmillan Co., New York, pp. 333– 360, 1964.
 1969, "What is Memory that it may have Hindsight and Foresight"
 1971, "Computing in the Semantic Domain"
 1971, "Technology. What Will It Mean to Librarians?"

References

Further reading 
 Asaro, Peter M. (2007). "Heinz von Foerster and the Bio-Computing Movements of the 1960s," in Albert Müller and Karl H. Müller (eds.) An Unfinished Revolution? Heinz von Foerster and the Biological Computer Laboratory | BCL 1958–1976. Vienna, Austria: Edition Echoraum.

External links

 Humanities Review Interview  at Stanford University
 The Heinz von Foerster Page
 Biological Computer Laboratory web site, University of Illinois
 An anthology of Circularity Principles from the Heinz von Foerster entry at The Cybernetics Society
 Gooch, Sherwin, & Nordin, Hud, 
 
 "Heinz Von Foerster Papers at the University of Illinois Archives"

1911 births
2002 deaths
Austrian scientists
Cyberneticists
Systems scientists
Epistemologists
Complex systems scientists
Singularitarians
Scientists from Vienna
TU Wien alumni
Management scientists
University of Breslau alumni
University of Illinois Urbana-Champaign faculty
American people of Austrian-Jewish descent
People from Pescadero, California
Austrian emigrants to the United States
Presidents of the International Society for the Systems Sciences